The Venice Tramway is a rubber-tired tramway (or guided bus) system forming part of the public transport system in Venice, Favaro Veneto, Mestre and Marghera, three boroughs of the city and comune of Venice, northeast Italy.

Since 2015, the tramway is connected to Piazzale Roma (the main bus station) in Venice.

The tramway uses Translohr rubber-tyred trams.

History
Trams returned to Mestre on 20 December 2010. Mestre's earlier urban and suburban tramway network had been disposed of more than half a century earlier, following the closure of its last line in 1941.

See also
 List of rubber-tyred tram systems
List of town tramway systems in Italy
History of rail transport in Italy
Rail transport in Italy

References

External links

 

Mestre
Transport in Venice
Venice